The skor daey (ស្គរដៃ "hand drum" or "clay drum") is a short goblet drum from Cambodia, approximately 40 centimeters tall and 15 centimeters wide at the top. There are two common goblet drums there, the skor chhaiyam (Khmer: ស្គរឆៃយ៉ាំ), a very long goblet drum, resembling some from Burma, and the skor daey.

Alternative spellings in English include skor dai (hand) and skor dei (clay, also alternative in Khmer: ស្គរដី). Other Khmer names included skor arak, skor kar (ស្គរការ), skor ayai (ស្គរអាយ៉ៃ។). The name skor areak or skor arak or skor aaroksa (Khmer:ស្គរអារក្ស) links this variant to the Arak music it is used to play. Skor kar linked it to kar boran music for weddings, where two drums are used, representing male and female. Skor ayai refers to ayai repartee singing, in which a man and woman alternate quick, witty comments or replies back and forth, accompanied by an ensemble. The small goblet drums may also be called skor toch, (Khmer: ស្គរតូច), literally small drum, but that may be a description and not a name.

Another small goblet drum used in Cambodia is the thon, a Thai name: โทน. Compared to the Skor daey, it "has a shallower head and a slimmer body."

See also
Music of Cambodia

References

External links
UNESCO document, Traditional Musical Instruments of Cambodia. PDF.
Picture of a skor chaiyam and smaller goblet drum, side by side.
Picture of a skor arak

Hand drums
Cambodian musical instruments